Kiahsville is an unincorporated community in southern Wayne County, West Virginia, United States. It is a part of the Huntington-Ashland, WV-KY-OH, Metropolitan Statistical Area (MSA). As of the 2000 census, the MSA had a population of 288,649. Its sister town is nearby Cove Gap.

Kiahsville is situated at the mouth of Kiah Creek. The community derives its name from Hezekiah Wiley, the name of an early settler.

East Lynn Lake is located nearby.

Nearby communities

 Cove Gap (0.1 miles)
 Queens Ridge
 Cuzzie (2.7 miles)
 Brabant (3.6 miles)
 Harts (7.7 miles)
 Ranger (8.1 miles)
 Wilsondale (9.4 miles)
 Breeden (9.5 miles)
 Genoa (9.6 miles)
 East Lynn (9.6 miles)
 Midkiff (10.8 miles)
 Dunlow (11.9 miles)
 Crum (12.7 miles)

References

Unincorporated communities in Wayne County, West Virginia
Unincorporated communities in West Virginia